These are lists of national symbols:
List of national animals
List of national anthems
List of national birds
List of national dances
List of national emblems
List of national flags
List of national founders
List of national fruits
List of national instruments (music)
List of national poets
List of national trees

See also
Floral emblem
National colours
National dish
National epic
National god
National sport

 
National symbols

fr:Emblème
pt:Emblema nacional
ta:தேசிய சின்னம்